Harry F. Mace  (August 1866 – April 26, 1930) was a pitcher in Major League Baseball for the 1891 Washington Statesmen. He played in the minors from 1889–1895 and managed in 1902.

External links

Major League Baseball pitchers
Washington Statesmen players
1866 births
1930 deaths
Newark Little Giants players
Washington Senators (minor league) players
Terre Haute Hottentots players
Aurora Indians players
Peoria Distillers players
Reading Actives players
Mobile Blackbirds players
Marinette Badgers players
Buffalo Bisons (minor league) players
Harrisburg Senators players
Richmond Crows players
Staunton Hayseeds players
Newport News-Hampton Deckhands players
Fort Worth Panthers players
Minor league baseball managers
Baseball players from Washington, D.C.
19th-century baseball players